EDWA is an abbreviation for erbium-doped waveguide amplifier. EDWA may also refer to:

 E.D.Wa., the United States District Court for the Eastern District of Washington
 Former acronym of the Department of Education and Training Western Australia, in RM Education